Major General Carl H. Freeman, USA (born 1947) is a retired American Quartermaster officer and former Chairman of the Inter-American Defense Board, Washington, D.C.

Early life 

Freeman was born in Lynwood, California.  He entered on active duty in 1969 at Fort Benning, Georgia as a Second Lieutenant. Over the course of his military career he served in Vietnam and as both an Infantry and Quartermaster Officer.

Military career 

Freeman’s past assignments include Commander, I Company, 1st Battalion, later Commander, 267th Petroleum Company, 240th Quartermaster Battalion, Fort Lee, Virginia; Commander, 612th Quartermaster Company (Aerial Delivery), 1st Corps Support Command, XVIII Airborne Corps, Fort Bragg, North Carolina; Aide-de-Camp to the Commander in Chief, US Southern Command, Quarry Heights, Panama; Chief, Officer Personnel Systems Division, Office of the Quartermaster General, Fort Lee, Virginia; Commander, 407th Supply and Transportation Battalion, 82nd Airborne Division, Fort Bragg, North Carolina; Commander 46th Corps Support Group, 1st Corps Support Command, XVIII Airborne Corps, Fort Bragg, North Carolina; Assistant Commandant, US Army Quartermaster Center and School, Fort Lee, Virginia; Commander, Defense Personnel Support Center, Defense Logistics Agency, Philadelphia, Pennsylvania, and Commanding General, 1st Corps Support Command, XVIII Airborne Corps, Fort Bragg, North Carolina.  Major General Freeman culminated his distinguished career as the Chairman, Inter-American Defense Board,

Education 

Freeman graduated from the University of Alabama with a Master of Arts degree in Latin American Studies, and he also received a Bachelor of Arts degree in History from Lafayette College. His military education includes the Infantry Officer Basic Course, Parachute Rigger Course, the Quartermaster Officer Advanced Course, Foreign Area Officer Course, the Mexican War College, the US Army School of the Americas, the US Army War College, and the CAPSTONE Military Leadership Program.

Decorations and honors 

 Distinguished Service Medal (U.S. Army)
 Defense Superior Service Medal with oak leaf cluster
 Legion of Merit with three oak leaf clusters
 Bronze Star Medal
 Purple Heart
 Defense Meritorious Service Medal
 Meritorious Service Medal with two oak leaf clusters
 Joint Service Commendation Medal
 Army Commendation Medal with oak leaf cluster
 Army Achievement Medal
 Combat Infantryman Badge
 Master Parachutist Badge
 Parachute Rigger Badge
 Joint Chiefs of Staff Identification Badge

Freeman is a Distinguished Member of the Quartermaster Regiment, recipient of the Distinguished Order of Saint Martin and a member of the Quartermaster Hall of Fame.

He holds the Ford Foundation-Harvard University Innovations in American Government Award and the Organization of American States Medal for distinguished service in the areas of humanitarian de-mining and natural disaster assistance.

References 

Hall of Fame Biography, Quartermaster Regimental Honors Program, June 18, 2010, Quartermaster School, Fort Lee, Virginia.

United States Army generals
Recipients of the Distinguished Service Medal (US Army)
Recipients of the Legion of Merit
1947 births
Living people
United States Army Command and General Staff College alumni
Quartermasters
Recipients of the Defense Superior Service Medal